Bracks is a surname. Notable people with the surname include:

Kate Bracks (born 1974), Australian reality television cook
Nick Bracks (born 1987), Australian male model, fashion designer and TV personality
Steve Bracks, former Australian politician and the 44th Premier of Victoria
Bracks Ministry, 65th ministry of the Government of Victoria led by the Premier of Victoria, Steve Bracks, and Deputy Premier, John Thwaites.

See also

Brack (disambiguation)
Brack (surname)